Numan Gumaa (1937–2014) was an Egyptian attorney and politician.

Career
Gumaa was elected chairman of the liberal New Wafd Party on 1 September 2000, succeeding Fuad Serageddin. He was nominated by his party for the  2005 Egyptian presidential election and came in third place.

References 

2014 deaths
1937 births
Candidates in the 2005 Egyptian presidential election
New Wafd Party politicians